Andrés Martínez Ferrandis (10 June 1978 – 25 June 2015) was a Spanish sprinter and European medalist.  Martinez won the bronze medal, running the third leg, at the 1998 European Athletics Championships – Men's 4 × 400 metres relay.

References

Spanish male sprinters
1978 births
2015 deaths